Gongliu may refer to:

 Tokkuztara County in China
 Gongliu of Zhou, an ancestor of the Zhou dynasty